Into the Okavango is a 2018 American National Geographic documentary film written, directed and produced by Neil Gelinas. The story of the film is about a team of modern day explorers who go for 1500 mile long expedition for a period of four months on a trip to three African nations namely Angola, Botswana and Namibia to save the Okavango River that joins the Okavango Delta. The film was predominantly shot in Angola and Botswana. It was released on 22 April 2018 and gained critical acclaim for the portrayal of wildlife. The documentary film was also screened in a handful of international film festivals and also won several awards and nominations.

Cast 

 Maans Booysen
 Steve Boyes
 Paul Skelton
 Bill Branch
 Gotz Neef
 Tumeletso Setlabosha
 Adjany Costa

Synopsis 
A passionate conservation biologist brings together a river bushman fearful of losing his past and a young aspiring scientist who is quite uncertain about her future on an epic expedition across three nations for a period of four months through unexplored and dangerous landscapes in order to safeguard the wildlife of Botswana and to save the Okavango Delta, which is one of the world heritage sites mentioned by the UNESCO.

Awards and nominations

References

External links 
 

2018 films
2010s English-language films
American documentary films
Angolan documentary films
Botswana films
Films shot in Namibia
Films shot in Angola
Films shot in Botswana
South African documentary films
2010s American films